Walther Hermann Richard Horn (19 October 1871 – 10 July 1939) was a German entomologist who specialised in beetles (Coleoptera). He was born in Berlin, where he also died. He is not to be confused with the American entomologist George Henry Horn who also studied Coleoptera.

Walther Horn was first a physician then the director of the German Entomological Institute.

Selected works

 1903. Zur Kenntnis der paläarktischen Cicindelen. Münchener koleopterologische Zeitschrift, 1(4):337-346. 
 1908. Coleoptera Adephaga. Fam. Carabidae Subfam. Cicindelinae. in: Wytsman P.(ed.), Genera Insectorum. Fascicule 82A. P. Wytsman, Brussels, pp. 1–104, pls. 1–5.
1910. Coleoptera Adephaga. Fam. Carabidae Subfam. Cicindelinae. in: P. Wytsman (ed.), Genera Insectorum. Fascicule 82B. P. Wytsman, Brussels, pp. 105–208, pls. 6–15.
1915. Coleoptera Adephaga. Fam. Carabidae Subfam. Cicindelinae. in: P. Wytsman (ed.), Genera Insectorum. Fascicule 82C. P. Wytsman, Brussels, pp. 209–486, pls. 16–23.
1926. Pars 86. Carabidae: Cicindelinae. IN: S. Schenkling (ed.), Coleopterorum Catalogus. W. Junk, Berlin, 345 pp.
1928–1929. With Sigmund Schenkling Index Litteraturae Entomologicae Horn, Berlin-Dahlem. A bibliography of entomology, covering the early printed works on entomology through to 1900 and describing over 25,000 printed items.

Collection
Horn's collection World Cicindelidae including larvae Larven and general Coleoptera collections (North Africa (1896), Ceylon (1899), North and South America (1902) and Persian Gulf (1926) are conserved in the German Entomological Institute.

References
Anonym [Horn, W. H. R.] Ann. Mus. Civ. Stor. Nat. G. Doria 60 2   
Anonym 1939 [Horn, W. H. R.]  Boll. Soc. Ent. Ital. 71 153   
Arrow, G. J. 1939: [Horn, W. H. R.] Entomologist's Monthly Magazine (3) 75 204-205   
De Beaux, O. 1940: [Horn, W. H. R.]  Ann. Mus. Civ. Stor. Nat. G. Doria 60(2)   
Osborn, H. 1937: Fragments of Entomological History Including Some Personal Recollections of Men and Events.  Columbus, Ohio, Published by the Author 1 1-394.
Osborn, H. 1952 A Brief History of Entomology Including Time of Demosthenes and Aristotle to Modern Times with over Five Hundred Portraits.  Columbus, Ohio, The Spahr & Glenn Company   
Solari 1939 [Horn, W. H. R.] Boll. Soc. Ent. Ital. 71 153-154

External links
 
 Index Novus Litteraturae Entomologicae Completely revised new edition of the "Index Litteraturae Entomologicae Bibliography of the literature on entomology from the beginning until 1863

Coleopterists
German entomologists
Scientists from Berlin
1871 births
1939 deaths